Sveti Đorđe is a village in the municipality of Ulcinj, Montenegro. It is located 15km northeast of Ulcinj, on the west bank of the Buna River which also functions as the Montenegro-Albania border.

Name
The village is named after Saint George, the highly venerated Christian saint. Both the Serbian and Albanian names of the village are essentially transliterations of Saint George. Local Albanians often refer to the village as "Shnergj".

History 
Sveti Đorđe was first mentioned historically in the 1582 census of the Sanjak of Scutari. The census referred to the village as a part of the Zabojana nahiyah.

Demographics

According to Montenegro's 2011 census, Sveti Đorđe had a population of 69 of which 28 were men (40.5%) and 41 were women (59.4%).

Ethnic Demographics 
According to Montenegro's 2011 census, all 69 residents of Sveti Đorđe were ethnically Albanian and considered Albanian to be their mother tongue. All 69 residents were Catholic.

References

Populated places in Ulcinj Municipality
Albanian communities in Montenegro
Catholic Church in Montenegro